Alexis Louis Nihon,  (May 15, 1902 – April 8, 1980) was a Belgian-born Canadian inventor and businessman.

Biography 

Born in Liège, Belgium, the son of Alexis Laurent Nihon and Marie Florentine Thiry, he moved to Canada when he was eighteen years old.

In 1940, he started the glass manufacturer Compagnie industrielle du verre limitée (Industrial Glass Works Company Limited) in Saint-Laurent, Quebec; it was one of the few Canadian glass manufacturers during the Second World War. He sold it in the 1940s. In 1946, he started Corporation Alexis Nihon (today Alexis Nihon REIT) that would later become one of the largest real estate companies in Canada.

He was married to Alice Robert Nihon. They had five children. He died at his home in Nassau, Bahamas
 in 1980.

In addition to the REIT (Real Estate Investment Trust), his name lives on as a major residential/commercial thoroughfare, Alexis Nihon Boulevard, and Alexis-Nihon Park, both in Saint-Laurent, and the Place Alexis Nihon shopping mall in downtown Montreal. It was built on one of his several tracts of land that he rented to developers.

References

 
 

1902 births
1980 deaths
Canadian people of Walloon descent
20th-century Canadian businesspeople
20th-century Canadian inventors
Canadian Officers of the Order of the British Empire
Businesspeople from Liège
Belgian emigrants to Canada